The Tampania House (also known as the Friederich House or Kirkeby House) is a historic home in Tampa, Florida. It is located at 4611 North A Street. On September 12, 1985, it was added to the U.S. National Register of Historic Places.

References and external links
 Hillsborough County listings at National Register of Historic Places
 Florida's Office of Cultural and Historical Programs
 Hillsborough County listings
 Tampania House

Gallery

References

Houses in Tampa, Florida
Houses on the National Register of Historic Places in Hillsborough County, Florida
History of Tampa, Florida
1927 establishments in Florida